Estadio 7 de Octubre is a multi-purpose stadium in Quevedo, Ecuador.  It is currently used mostly for and football matches and hosts the homes matches of Club Deportivo Quevedo of the Ecuadorian Serie A .  The stadium has a capacity 15,200 spectators.

References

7 de Octubre
Buildings and structures in Los Ríos Province
7 de Octubre
C.D. Quevedo
1952 establishments in Ecuador